Netiwit 'Frank' Chotiphatphaisal (born 10 September 1996) is a Thai student activist, librarian, preservationist, conscientious objector, publisher, and author. He is a founder of TERA (Thailand Educational Revolution Alliance) and Education for Liberation of Siam. Both groups aim to reform the Thai education system. In addition, he has established Samnak Nisit Sam Yan Press for publishing thoughts and ideas in Thai language, and also Humanity Beyond Borders for giving assistance to refugees and those in needs of protection.

Netiwit is an outspoken activist who speaks against the Thai Junta both on Facebook and in public. In 2018, the National Council for Peace and Order (NCPO) filed a police complaint against him and six activists for being leaders of the protest and accused them, along with thirty-two other protesters, of violating the 2015 Public Assembly Act, which might cost him 7–9 years in jail.

Netiwit was elected as the student council president at Chulalongkorn University, but was removed from the position and had his behavior score deducted by university authorities in consequence of 2017 Chulalongkorn University incident. This was in spite of support from eight Nobel laureates, as well as noted academics such as Noam Chomsky, Steven Pinker, and others. However, after he filed a petition with the Administrative Court against Chulalongkorn University, the court ruled in his favor a year later, and his position and behavior score were restored.

Netiwit is currently studying political science at Chulalongkorn University while being a librarian at the Santi Pracha Dhamma Library.

In April 2020, he was voted by students of Faculty of Political Science, Chulalongkorn University to be the President of the Political Science Student Union of Chulalongkorn University for 2020–2021. 

On 31 March 2021, Netiwit was elected by Chulalongkorn University undergraduates to be the President of Chulalongkorn University's Student Union (SUCU) with a landslide victory, the highest votes received for the position and highest-turnout rate over decades.

Early life 
Netiwit Chotiphatphaisal was born 10 September 1996 in Bangkok, Thailand. He is the second child of a middle-class family of shopkeepers, growing up in Samut Prakan Province.

TERA 
In 2012, Netiwit and a group of fellow students formed TERA (Thailand Education Revolution Alliance). A student-led organization, TERA aimed to pressure education authorities to reform the Thai education system. This includes abolishing strict uniform codes, increasing the quality of teachers and curriculum, reducing rote-style education, and increasing the number of public schools. Netiwit gained public recognition after appearing on a television program to speak about the organization and its cause.

Education for Liberation of Siam 
Education for Liberation of Siam was formed in December 2013 by Netiwit and other student activists. Netiwit serves as the first secretary of the organization. The purpose of the group is to provide a platform for student activism and disseminating questionable actions and misconduct by authority figures in the Thai education system. In 2014, under the secretary general Nattanan Warintarawet, the organization gained prominence for protesting against educational reforms put in place by the Junta.

Activism at Chulalongkorn University 
In July 2016, Netiwit and a friend caused controversy by refusing to prostrate before the statue of King Rama V at an annual Chulalongkorn University event citing that King Rama V himself abolished the act. He received both praise and criticism from the act, notably the ire of General Prayut Chan-o-cha, leader of Thailand's junta.

In 2016, Netiwit personally invited activist Joshua Wong to speak at an event commemorating the 1976 Thammasat University massacre. Wong was detained for twelve hours upon entering Thailand but managed to speak to attendees via Skype after being deported. In May 2017, Netiwit was elected as Student Council President at Chulalongkorn University.

Removal from the Student Council 

Netiwit and seven other members of the student council walked out of an oath-giving ceremony requiring them to prostrate in front of a statue of King Rama VI in symbolic protest. As a result, one of the members was assaulted by a professor, Reungwit Bunjongrat, and the protesting members had their "behavioural scores" cut by the university as punishment. Subsequently, this led to the members, including Netiwit, being removed from their position on the student council. Netiwit has since received support from academics and activists internationally, including Nobel Prize laureate Roald Hoffmann, scholar and political activist Noam Chomsky, and Harvard psychologist Steven Pinker. In January 2018, seven Nobel laureates sent a petition to Chulalongkorn University to appeal for Netiwit and his seven friends and to criticize the university.

In 2019 after he filed a petition with the Court against Chulalongkorn University, the administrative court ruled in his favor since then Chulalongkorn university authority returned his position and behavioural points to him.

Political Science Student Union of Chulalongkorn University 
In June 2020, Netiwit and his team, Demosingh Party, were elected to serve as the board of the Political Science Student Union of Chulalongkorn University (PSCU). Netiwit was the President of the Student Union in the Faculty of Political Science. 

During his term in PSCU, he had addressed and engaged in many social and political issues, such as Chao Mae Tubtim Shrine, Scala Theatre. Moreover, his student union had published many public statements involving contemporary events and political developments in Thailand, including the forced disaprearance of Thai activist-in-exile Wanchalearm Satsaksit, 2021 Myanmar Coup d'etat, condemning the State's violence against demonstrations and charge of article 112, and so much more.

This term of Netiwit's team has changed the University along with the development of protests across the country against Prayut Chan-o-cha's government.

Student Government of Chulalongkorn University 
In June 2021, Netiwit and his team, Chula for ALL Party, were elected in the Student Union of Chulalongkorn University (SUCU) as the Student Government of Chulalongkorn University (SGCU) .

Results of 2021 President of Student Union of Chulalongkorn University

Sam Yan Press 
Samnak Nisit Sam Yan Publishing House, aka Sam Yan Press, has been established by Netiwit and his friends after removed from the Student Council.

The Publishing House was founded for the purpose of providing spaces for students to present their thoughts and opinions, translate interesting and activism books from foreign languages. 

The name reflects the recognition and value of the local community surrounding the university, ‘Sam Yan’ which nowadays are being destroyed and losing their identities. Netiwit and friends are advocates for the university to be inclusive and value the ways of community’s life. The name also reflects their sense of belonging while they, students, face the challenges in the world.

Political case

2018 sedition charges 
On 25 January 2018, Netiwit joined as an observer in an anti-junta protest organized by the Democracy Restoration Group (DRG) in the subway close to the MBK Center. On 29 January, the National Council for Peace and Order (NCPO) filed a police complaint against him and six activists for being leaders of the protest and accused them, along with thirty-two other protesters, of violating the 2015 Public Assembly Act.

On 8 February, the court released him unconditionally, along with the other thirty-two activists.
However, the police sent the appeal to the court, so the case has still not been ruled on.

On 25 December 2020, the Criminal Court dismissed all charges against Netiwit and activists including Anon Nampa, Sombat Boongamanong, Rangsiman Rome and Sirawith Seritiwat.

RDN50 
On 10 February 2018, Netiwit joined as an observer in an anti-junta protest "Stop power Stop late election time up NCPO. start Democracy" in Mac Donald near Democracy Monument. The next week he was accused of violating the 2015 Public Assembly Act and disturbing peace in the country. The case has still not been ruled on by the court.

ARMY57 
On 24 March 2018, Metiwit joined as an activity of Thammasart University and Royal Thai Army. He was one of 57 people accused by police of violating the 2015 Public Assembly Act and disturbing peace in the country. The case has still not been ruled on by the court.

UN 62 
On 22 May 2018, Netiwit joined as a protester calling the Junta to give the general election to the Thai people and resign from the government. That day, protesters went to protest in front of the United Nations headquarter in Bangkok. Netiwit did not go there. However, the following week he was accused by police of violating the 2015 Public Assembly Act and disturbing peace in the country. The case has still not been ruled on by the court.

In May 2018, the Humboldt University student council made a public statement on the official website calling on university leaders and student representatives in Germany to stand with him and asking the Thai government to drop all charges against him and others immediately.

Amnesty International Thailand 
In 2018, he ran as board member of Amnesty International Thailand, AIT, and to be elected in the Annual General Meeting 2019 on 21 July 2018. AIT then filed a request to the Bangkok Association Registrar to have a replacement of board member. However, the Bangkok Association Registrar informed AIT that they could not register and issue a permit for the registration of all-new board members invoking Netiwit's improper demeanor or lack of qualifications to be a member of an association's board. An appeal was filed, as a result of which the authorities accepted the registration of three new board members save for Netiwit.

AIT later filed an appeal with the Minister of Interior furhishing and was further informed that Netiwit was being held criminally liable in four cases for "being complicit in an act to defy the Head of the National Council for Peace and Order no. 3/2558 on "The Maintenance of Public Order and National Security's Article 12". The authorities therefore deemed his demeanor unfit for administrating an association serving the public interest and for setting an example for the general public and youth. He was therefore considered unqualified to sit as a board member of the association since it may affect public order and national security.

The alleged police document leaked to Netiwit in 2020 outlines four points regarding his 'unsuitable behavior' from when he was in high school to his time at Chulalongkorn University.

The four points are:
Unsuitable behavior that breaches Thai etiquette and culture (citing his demand to abolish school hair-cut rules when he was in high school)
Non-cooperation with military conscription in accordance with the law
Leading and/or participating in a protest that would harm Thai diplomatic relations (citing his demonstration in support of Liu Xiaobo and 1989 Tiananmen Square protests) 
Actions against provisions and litigation

In October 2019, AIT and Netiwit filed a lawsuit with the Administrative Court, the defendants are the registrar for alleged abuse of power in disqualifying Netiwit and Interior Minister Gen Anupong Paochinda for neglect of duty for failing to deliver the appeal result in the stipulated timeframe.

Transnational Activism

Netiwit has been credited as a transnational activist for Thai and Hong Kong democracy movement ahead of the arrival of Milk Tea Alliance in 2020 through an invitation to Joshua Wong to speak at Chulalongkorn University in 2016 and issuing a translation of a book in support of the Hong Kong movement in 2017

He has been one or the organizer of a protest to commemorate the Tiananmen incident in front of the Chinese embassy in Thailand since 2018. The police did not allow him to hold protests in front of the Chinese embassy in 2020, he made Tiananmen cookies to commemorate the events instead. 

In 2018, Netiwit co-founded Humanity Beyond Borders aiming to raise funds in order to help refugees in Thailand organize activities and produce academic works to encourage knowledge and understanding of the problem of human rights violations in other countries.  Netiwit has written a profile of Muay, Houayheuang Xayabouly, a Lao environmentalist who has been arrested by the Lao Government since 2019, and campaigned to release her.  In 2020, Manushya Foundation, Human Rights Foundation and Humanity Beyond Borders sent the joint submission on behalf of Muay to Working Group on Arbitrary Detention (UNWGAD) with success; on 23 January 2021 the UNWGAD published a decision declaring Muay's detention to be arbitrary under international law, urging Laos to release her immediately, and calling for a full and independent investigation into her arbitrary detention

Urban activism
Netiwit has strongly against gentrification of Chulalongkorn University's neighbourhood   
In June 2020, He and Chulalongkorn University students demonstrated against Chulalongkorn University's decision to demolish the Chao Mae Tubtim Shrine located near the campus  for building new condominiums. Claiming the shrine as the last remaining Sam Yan neighbourhood heritage, he quoted Oscar Wilde's phrase that "The cynic knows the price of everything and the value of nothing." 
In 2021, Netiwit and the Chulalongkorn University's student union raised banners in front of Scala against the demolition of the historic Scala Theatre, then the largest standalone cinema in Southeast Asia.  He criticized Chulalongkorn University for acting less like an institute of higher learning and more like a big business.

Recognition
 In 2013, Netiwit had been nominated for a National Human Rights Commission (NHRC) award, but he rejected it, stating that he doubts whether the NHRC really takes the human rights issues seriously.
In 2018 Netiwit was invited as one of the speakers at Oslo Freedom Forum 2018, which sponsored by the Human Rights Foundation.
In 2018, Netiwit was announced as one of 50 Asians to watch in the public and social sector by the Straits Times (Singapore Press) as an honor to his social work, especially in democracy, education and military conscription.
 President of the Political Science Student Union of Chulalongkorn University for 2020–2021
 President of Chulalongkorn University's Student Union (SUCU)for 2021-2022

Publishing
After he was stripped of the position of the president of the student council, Netiwit and his colleagues founded Sam Nak Nisit Sam Yan Publishing (SCPH), a non-profit publisher, with the aim of publishing students' books and Thai translations of foreign political and philosophical works concerned with human rights and democratic ideas. In a statement on SCPH's website, it emphasizes bridging knowledge from the East and West in order to promote a secure foundation for upholding human rights both in and out of Thailand as well as the means to strengthen communication between professors, students and the general public.

The first work published by SCPH was the book published while Joshua Wong was in jail due to his conviction being overturned by the Hong Kong court in October 2017. The book, Time is on our side: A birthday book for Joshua Wong, which was translated by Netiwit himself, contained translated essays from Martin Luther King Jr. ("Letter from Birmingham Jail") and Liu Xiaobo ("Tiananmen Square: The hunger strike declaration, 2 June 1989"), as well as a translated interview with Joshua Wong. SCPH has also published the works of philosophers such as Isaiah Berlin, Liu Xiaobo, Cass Sunstein, Timothy Snyder, Vaclav Havel, Rebecca Solnit as well as other activists' work.

Joshua Wong, a prominent activist, stated, 'Sam Nak Nisit Samyang Publishing offers to youngsters of Thai a lesson on how to confront authoritarian oppression under a hard-line policy of the regime.'

Writing and translating
Netiwit has written many books on his experience with Thai education in general and his school in particular; his most well-known book is A Bad Student In an Excellent Educational System concerning his struggles in high school.  He also wrote about his opinion on Thai politics and on the Chinese abusing the human rights of Uighurs, Hong Kong, and Tibetans. In 2018, he wrote a pamphlet called 'I Can Love My Country Without Having to be Drafted' arguing why enforced conscription in Thailand is obsolete.
Netiwit translated Martin Luther King Jr.'s "Letter from Birmingham Jail" and Liu Xiaobo's "Second June Hunger Strike Declaration" to raise funds for the twenty-first birthday of his friend Joshua Wong, who was in jail at the time. Netiwit has also worked with his friends to translate a selection of Isaiah Berlin's essays into Thai and sent it to Deputy Police Commissioner Pol General Srivara Ransibrahmanakul which charged Netiwit with false PR (public relations). He also translated 'On Tyranny' by Timothy Snyder as well as the work of Vaclav Havel, Thomas Paine, Noam Chomsky and Tony Judt. Netiwit published his Thai translation, I Have No Enemies, the first collected essays of the late Liu Xiaobo, Chinese dissidents, in which Joshua Wong and Perry Link wrote the foreword, and translated work on the devastating Uighur situation in China.

Bibliography

Books written 

  (2014)
 (2015)
 (2016)
 (2017)
 (2018)
 (2018)
 (2018)

Books translated 

 (Time is on Our Side: A Book for Joshua Wong's 21st Birthday)  (2017)
 (Messages to Our Century: Three Essays of Isaiah Berlin)  (2018)
 (On Tyranny: Twenty Lessons from the Twentieth Century)   (2018)
 (I Have No Enemies: Selected Essays of Liu Xiaobo)  (2018)

References

External links 
 Netiwit Chotiphatphaisal's Website "Netiwit.com"
 Facebook FanPage "Netiwit Ntw"
 Youtube Channel "เนติวิทย์ โชติภัทร์ไพศาล"
 Goodreads "เนติวิทย์ โชติภัทร์ไพศาล"

1996 births
Netiwit Chotiphatphaisal
Netiwit Chotiphatphaisal
Netiwit Chotiphatphaisal
Conscientious objectors
Netiwit Chotiphatphaisal
Netiwit Chotiphatphaisal
Netiwit Chotiphatphaisal
Education activists
Living people
Child activists